Cando is a hamlet in Rosemount Rural Municipality No. 378, Saskatchewan, Canada. In 2006 the village had a population of 68 people. It previously held the status of village until December 31, 2005. The hamlet is located 48 km south of the City of North Battleford on highway 4. The community was served by Canadian National Railway's Porter Subdivision. The rail line was originally built by the Grand Truck Pacific from Oban to Battleford. The community is situated along the remains of the historic Swift Current-Battleford Trail. The portion of the line from Battleford to Cando was closed in 1974, leaving the portion to Cando from Oban. Once the elevator at Cando closed the remainder of the line was abandoned in the late 1980s.

This hamlet was named after Cando, North Dakota, the original home of Charles Alexander Coulton Edwards, the first postmaster.

History
Prior to December 31, 2005, Cando was incorporated as a village, and was restructured as a hamlet under the jurisdiction of the Rural municipality of Rosemount on that date.

Demographics

See also
List of communities in Saskatchewan
Hamlets of Saskatchewan

References

Designated places in Saskatchewan
Former villages in Saskatchewan
Rosemount No. 378, Saskatchewan
Unincorporated communities in Saskatchewan
Populated places disestablished in 2005